William Joseph "Buzz" Dozier (August 31, 1928 – November 24, 2005) was a pitcher in Major League Baseball. He played for the Washington Senators.

References

External links

1928 births
2005 deaths
Major League Baseball pitchers
Washington Senators (1901–1960) players
Baseball players from Texas
Sportspeople from Waco, Texas